The Terminator: Rampage is a first-person shooter video game released for personal computers with the operating system DOS by Bethesda Softworks in 1993. It is the third game based on the Terminator film series that was made by Bethesda, following The Terminator and The Terminator 2029.

Plot
Skynet has sent a computer core containing its core programming back to 1984, shortly before its ultimate defeat at the hands of John Connor's human resistance in 2024. The computer core (known as the Meta-Node) arrives at Cyberdyne Systems' headquarters at the Cheyenne Mountain Complex, and proceeds to take over the building and begin manufacturing an army of Terminators. A lone commando is sent into the past by John Connor, arriving there in 1988. His mission is to destroy the Skynet computer core and eliminate the threat of Skynet once and for all. To do so, players must explore the 32 floors of the Cyberdyne building, fighting off various Skynet robots and cyborgs while assembling the pieces of a prototype plasma weapon called the V-TEC PPC (Phased Plasma Cannon), the only means of destroying the Meta-Node.

Gameplay
The game's levels are grid-based 3D mazes, similar in design to Wolfenstein 3D. Players explore each level searching for the stairs leading down to the next level, with the Skynet computer core located underground. The game contains dungeon crawl elements, as the nature of the game's mazelike levels sometimes requires players to backtrack between levels in order to access previously inaccessible areas of a level. Exploration of the game's levels is required to finish the game, as the player must collect and assemble various scattered pieces of a plasma gun, which is the only weapon capable of harming the game's final boss.

Development
The Terminator: Rampage used the same engine as The Elder Scrolls: Arena. According to Bethesda, the game was influential in the development of Doom. Id Software showed a lot of interest in the production of this particular game at Bethesda's stands at various trade shows.

Reception
Computer Gaming World in February 1994 said that the game resembled Doom "though the gameplay doesn't compare. Action, regardless of difficulty, is intense". The magazine said in March 1994 that the game was "a decent attempt for an imitative product, but you might say that the effort to catch-up and cash-in on id Software's success was doomed from the beginning".

Roy Bassave of Odessa American said in May 1994 "No special glasses needed to enjoy this very real Virtual Reality experience. The closest thing is Capstone's "Corridor 7" game with Wolfenstein 3D programming.

The game sold 30,000 units in its first week.

References

External links

1993 video games
Bethesda Softworks games
DOS games
DOS-only games
First-person shooters
Terminator (franchise) video games
U.S. Gold games
Video games about time travel
Video games developed in the United States
Video games set in 1988
Video games set in Colorado
Video games set in the United States
Sprite-based first-person shooters
Single-player video games